Percy Emerson Culverhouse (20 August 1871 – 7 May 1953) was the chief architect of the Great Western Railway from 1929 to 1945.

Career

He was born on 20 August 1871 to Eli Culverhouse (1828-1911) and Jane Mary Jones (1840-1919).

At age 21 he was registered as a clerk at Paddington Station, working for the Great Western Railway. He progressed to Architectural Assistant to the New Works Engineer and in April 1929 was appointed Chief Architect to the Great Western Railway. He retired in September 1945 and was succeeded by Brian Lewis.

He married Madeline Anina Ella Walker on 3 April 1902.

He died on 7 May 1953 in Ealing, Middlesex leaving an estate of £8013 15s 6d.

Works
Bath railway station 1896 refreshment rooms alterations 
Banbury railway station 1904 refreshment rooms alterations 
Canon’s Marsh Goods Sheed, Anchor Road, Bristol 1906 
Hammersmith railway station 1909
Newton Abbot railway station 1927 
Bristol Temple Meads railway station. Additional platforms and cream terracotta buildings. 1930–35 
Paddington railway station Eastbourne Terrace Elevation, 18 bays of offices 1930–36 
Great Western Royal Hotel, Paddington 1930s extensions.
Cardiff Central railway station 1932–35
Bourton-on-the-Water railway station 1936
Leamington Spa railway station 1939

References

20th-century English architects
British railway architects
Great Western Railway people
1871 births
1953 deaths